The strong interaction or strong force is a fundamental interaction that confines quarks into proton, neutron, and other hadron particles. The strong interaction also binds neutrons and protons to create atomic nuclei, where it is called the nuclear force.

Most of the mass of a common proton or neutron is the result of the strong interaction energy; the individual quarks provide only about 1% of the mass of a proton. At the range of 10−15 m (slightly more than the radius of a nucleon), the strong force is approximately 100 times as strong as electromagnetism, 106 times as strong as the weak interaction, and 1038 times as strong as gravitation.

The strong interaction is observable at two ranges and mediated by two force carriers. On a larger scale (of about 1 to 3 fm), it is the force (carried by mesons) that binds protons and neutrons (nucleons) together to form the nucleus of an atom. On the smaller scale (less than about 0.8 fm, the radius of a nucleon), it is the force (carried by gluons) that holds quarks together to form protons, neutrons, and other hadron particles. In the latter context, it is often known as the color force. The strong force inherently has such a high strength that hadrons bound by the strong force can produce new massive particles. Thus, if hadrons are struck by high-energy particles, they give rise to new hadrons instead of emitting freely moving radiation (gluons). This property of the strong force is called color confinement, and it prevents the free "emission" of the strong force: instead, in practice, jets of massive particles are produced.

In the context of atomic nuclei, the same strong interaction force (that binds quarks within a nucleon) also binds protons and neutrons together to form a nucleus. In this capacity it is called the nuclear force (or residual strong force). So the residuum from the strong interaction within protons and neutrons also binds nuclei together. As such, the residual strong interaction obeys a distance-dependent behavior between nucleons that is quite different from that when it is acting to bind quarks within nucleons. Additionally, distinctions exist in the binding energies of the nuclear force of nuclear fusion vs nuclear fission. Nuclear fusion accounts for most energy production in the Sun and other stars. Nuclear fission allows for decay of radioactive elements and isotopes, although it is often mediated by the weak interaction. Artificially, the energy associated with the nuclear force is partially released in nuclear power and nuclear weapons, both in uranium or plutonium-based fission weapons and in fusion weapons like the hydrogen bomb.

The strong interaction is mediated by the exchange of massless particles called gluons that act between quarks, antiquarks, and other gluons. Gluons are thought to interact with quarks and other gluons by way of a type of charge called color charge. Color charge is analogous to electromagnetic charge, but it comes in three types (±red, ±green, and ±blue) rather than one, which results in a different type of force, with different rules of behavior. These rules are detailed in the theory of quantum chromodynamics (QCD), which is the theory of quark–gluon interactions.

History
Before 1971, physicists were uncertain as to how the atomic nucleus was bound together. It was known that the nucleus was composed of protons and neutrons and that protons possessed positive electric charge, while neutrons were electrically neutral. By the understanding of physics at that time, positive charges would repel one another and the positively charged protons should cause the nucleus to fly apart. However, this was never observed. New physics was needed to explain this phenomenon.

A stronger attractive force was postulated to explain how the atomic nucleus was bound despite the protons' mutual electromagnetic repulsion. This hypothesized force was called the strong force, which was believed to be a fundamental force that acted on the protons and neutrons that make up the nucleus.

In 1964, Murray Gell-Mann and George Zweig proposed the quark model, which holds that protons and neutrons (along with other subatomic particles called hadrons and mesons) are actually made up of smaller particles called quarks. The strong attraction between nucleons was the side-effect of a more fundamental force that bound the quarks together into protons and neutrons. The theory of quantum chromodynamics explains that quarks carry what is called a color charge, although it has no relation to visible color. Quarks with unlike color charge attract one another as a result of the strong interaction, and the particle that mediates this was called the gluon.

Behavior of the strong force

The word strong is used since the strong interaction is the "strongest" of the four fundamental forces. At a distance of 10−15 m, its strength is around 100 times that of the electromagnetic force, some 106 times as great as that of the weak force, and about 1038 times that of gravitation.

The strong force is described by quantum chromodynamics (QCD), a part of the Standard Model of particle physics. Mathematically, QCD is a non-Abelian gauge theory based on a local (gauge) symmetry group called SU(3).

The force carrier particle of the strong interaction is the gluon, a massless gauge boson. Unlike the photon in electromagnetism, which is neutral, the gluon carries a color charge. Quarks and gluons are the only fundamental particles that carry non-vanishing color charge, and hence they participate in strong interactions only with each other. The strong force is the expression of the gluon interaction with other quark and gluon particles.

All quarks and gluons in QCD interact with each other through the strong force. The strength of interaction is parameterized by the strong coupling constant. This strength is modified by the gauge color charge of the particle, a group-theoretical property.

The strong force acts between quarks. Unlike all other forces (electromagnetic, weak, and gravitational), the strong force does not diminish in strength with increasing distance between pairs of quarks. After a limiting distance (about the size of a hadron) has been reached, it remains at a strength of about 10,000 newtons (N), no matter how much farther the distance between the quarks. As the separation between the quarks grows, the energy added to the pair creates new pairs of matching quarks between the original two; hence it is impossible to isolate quarks. The explanation is that the amount of work done against a force of 10,000 newtons is enough to create particle–antiparticle pairs within a very short distance of that interaction. The very energy added to the system required to pull two quarks apart would create a pair of new quarks that will pair up with the original ones. In QCD, this phenomenon is called color confinement; as a result only hadrons, not individual free quarks, can be observed. The failure of all experiments that have searched for free quarks is considered to be evidence of this phenomenon.

The elementary quark and gluon particles involved in a high energy collision are not directly observable. The interaction produces jets of newly created hadrons that are observable. Those hadrons are created, as a manifestation of mass–energy equivalence, when sufficient energy is deposited into a quark–quark bond, as when a quark in one proton is struck by a very fast quark of another impacting proton during a particle accelerator experiment. However, quark–gluon plasmas have been observed.

Residual strong force

Contrary to the description above of distance independence, in the post-Big Bang universe it is not the case that every quark in the universe attracts every other quark. Color confinement implies that the strong force acts without distance-diminishment only between pairs of quarks, and that in compact collections of bound quarks (hadrons), the net color-charge of the quarks essentially cancels out, resulting in a limit of the action of the color-forces: From distances approaching or greater than the radius of a proton, compact collections of color-interacting quarks (hadrons) collectively appear to have effectively no color-charge, or "colorless", and the strong force is therefore nearly absent between those hadrons. However, the cancellation is not quite perfect, and a residual force (described below) remains. This residual force does diminish rapidly with distance, and is thus very short-range (effectively a few femtometres). It manifests as a force between the "colorless" hadrons, and is known as the nuclear force or residual strong force (and historically as the strong nuclear force).

The nuclear force acts between hadrons, known as mesons and baryons. This "residual strong force", acting indirectly, transmits gluons that form part of the virtual π and ρ mesons, which, in turn, transmit the force between nucleons that holds the nucleus (beyond hydrogen-1 nucleus) together.

The residual strong force is thus a minor residuum of the strong force that binds quarks together into protons and neutrons. This same force is much weaker between neutrons and protons, because it is mostly neutralized within them, in the same way that electromagnetic forces between neutral atoms (van der Waals forces) are much weaker than the electromagnetic forces that hold electrons in association with the nucleus, forming the atoms.

Unlike the strong force, the residual strong force diminishes with distance, and does so rapidly. The decrease is approximately as a negative exponential power of distance, though there is no simple expression known for this; see Yukawa potential. The rapid decrease with distance of the attractive residual force and the less-rapid decrease of the repulsive electromagnetic force acting between protons within a nucleus, causes the instability of larger atomic nuclei, such as all those with atomic numbers larger than 82 (the element lead).

Although the nuclear force is weaker than the strong interaction itself, it is still highly energetic: transitions produce gamma rays. The mass of a nucleus is significantly different from the summed masses of the individual nucleons. This mass defect is due to the potential energy associated with the nuclear force. Differences between mass defects power nuclear fusion and nuclear fission.

Unification 
The so-called Grand Unified Theories (GUT) aim to describe the strong interaction and the electroweak interaction as aspects of a single force, similarly to how the electromagnetic and weak interactions were unified by the Glashow–Weinberg–Salam model into electroweak interaction. The strong interaction has a property called asymptotic freedom, wherein the strength of the strong force diminishes at higher energies (or temperatures). The theorized energy where its strength becomes equal to the electroweak interaction is the grand unification energy. However, no Grand Unified Theory has yet been successfully formulated to describe this process, and Grand Unification remains an unsolved problem in physics.

If GUT is correct, after the Big Bang and during the electroweak epoch of the universe, the electroweak force separated from the strong force. Accordingly, a grand unification epoch is hypothesized to have existed prior to this.

See also

 Color charge
 Coupling constant
 Nuclear binding energy
 Nuclear physics
 QCD matter and Quark–gluon plasma
 Quantum field theory and Gauge theory
 Standard Model of particle physics
 Mathematical formulation of quantum mechanics
 Mathematical formulation of the Standard Model
 Weak interaction, Electromagnetism and Gravity
 Yukawa interaction

References

Further reading

External links

Quantum chromodynamics
Nuclear physics
Fundamental interactions